"Wings of an Eagle" is a song written and recorded by Australian singer Russell Morris. Not to be confused with the American Metrocolor film The Wings of Eagles or Ken Follett's novel On Wings of Eagles, the song was produced by Peter Dawkins. It was released in November 1972 and peaked at number 9 on the Australian Go-Set chart in January 1973, becoming Morris' sixth top twenty. It was Morris' final release on the His Master's Voice/ EMI label, before signing with Wizard Records.

Australian music journalist Ian McFarlane said the song was "brilliant".

The song was inspired by Morris' love for ancient mythology, and how First Australians, Native Americans and early Romans believed an eagle took the spirits of the dead to the heavens.

Track listing
 7" Single
Side A "Wings of an Eagle" - 3:51
Side B "Satisfy You" -  2:16

Charts

Weekly charts

Year-end charts

References

1972 singles
1972 songs
Russell Morris songs
EMI Records singles
Songs written by Russell Morris